Diocese of Beirut or Eparchy of Beirut may refer to:

 Syriac Catholic Diocese of Beirut, patriarchal diocese of the Syriac Catholic Church, centered in Beirut
 Chaldean Catholic Diocese of Beirut, a Chaldean Catholic diocese, centered in Beirut
 Roman Catholic Diocese of Beirut, former (medieval) Roman Catholic diocese, centered in Beirut

It may also refer to:
 Armenian Apostolic Diocese of Lebanon, an Armenian Oriental-Orthodox diocese, centered in Beirut

See also 
 Archdiocese of Beirut (disambiguation)
 Archbishop of Beirut (disambiguation)
 Christianity in Lebanon